Feedback is the fourth and most recent studio album by American hip hop group Jurassic 5. It was released on July 25, 2006. It is the only album the band released as a quintet, in the wake of Cut Chemist's departure earlier that year.

Critical reception
At Metacritic, which assigns a weighted average score out of 100 to reviews from mainstream critics, Feedback received an average score of 57% based on 26 reviews, indicating "mixed or average reviews".

Track listing

The UK Special Edition version of the album also contains a bonus track, "A Day at the Races (Live at Brixton Academy)". Another UK edition contains "What's Golden", also recorded at Brixton Academy.

Album singles

Charts

References

External links
 

2006 albums
Jurassic 5 albums
Albums produced by Exile (producer)
Albums produced by Salaam Remi
Albums produced by Scott Storch
Interscope Records albums